Soubane or Téra-Téra is a Nigerien handwoven loincloth. As its name suggests, it originated from the Songhai region of Téra in the Tillaberi Region of Niger. It is worn by the Songhai and Zarma peoples and it is seen as a cultural symbol.
It is made by traditional weavers called "tchakey" with wool and cotton. It was generally made in two colours, the black and white loincloths.

History
West African cultures have been weaving textiles for thousands of years. Among Songhai/Zarma weavers, the weaving tradition is quite rigid because it is linked to a certain width of a leaf to the notches of a counter stick which allows the decorative patterns to be combined from one strip of a cotton to another so that once brought together edge to edge, they form a harmonious and meticulously calculated whole. The decorations of the loincloths of téra-téra for example include characters at the well, oxen, donkeys, camels, all motifs that evoke daily life, expresses joy, and symbolize the peasant wealth in the eyes of sedentary people. "Téra-téra" in the past was used by both Somghai men and women either on special occasions or as everyday clothing by wealthy families.
It was considered a symbol of good grace. In the past, rich families had their own weavers and all the Soubane that the family wore were woven by the family weaver.

Marriages

In the past, Songhai-Zarma brides were always wrapped in “soubane” or “tera-tera” when it was time to be sent off to their husband's house.

Before the wedding day, the mother of the future bride establishes a bond with a weaver from whom she will order the “soubane” of her daughter. Generally, she chooses her weaver according to the latter's talent and the weaver's  knowledge of the structure of the patterns of the "tera-tera". If the mother of the bride has the means, she would buy two soubanes (one for the bride and the other for the groom)

References

Nigerian clothing